Monfort Bat Sanctuary has been the house of a large colony of 2.3 million Rousette fruit bats since recorded history. According to Guinness World Records, it is the largest single colony of this kind.

Fruit bats 
Fruit bats are an extremely popular type of bat that can also be called megabats. The bats originate from tropical regions of the Old World. They don't hibernate and since they dislike the cold, tropical regions suit them best. Fruit bats diet includes fruit and nectar. During their Circadian flight, fruit bats gather 1.5 to 3 times their body weight in food. Certain types of fruit bats have short jaws and powerful teeth to pierce into fruit. Others have long tongues and snouts to reach pollen and nectar. Some types of fruit bats can have a 5 feet wing span, the largest of all bats. Other fruit bats only have a 6 centimeter long wing span. All but a few types of fruit bats are nocturnal. The ones occupying The Monfort Bat Sanctuary are nocturnal. These bats are quite rare because they are killed for food. Other predators include crows, rats, -long pythons, and lizards. Usually fruit bats can survive these creature attacks. Their major predators are feral dogs and cats.

Owner 
The Iñigo-Monfort family has maintained the area since the 1900s. Norma Monfort is the current owner of the 57 acres of land including its 1.8 million fruit bats. She enclosed the property to discourage any possible bat hunters. Additionally, she hired 24-hour guards to protect the bats. Norma Monfort was named 2011 Disney Worldwide Conservation Fund Hero.

Sightseeing 
With such an abundant amount of fruit bats, visitors can get an up close look from outside any of the five entrances. Visitors cannot enter because any disturbance can cause panic to the bats. Late afternoon is suggested to be the best time to visit because of the daily Circadian flight. The Circadian flight occurs right after sunset, when millions of bats fly out of the cave to find food. There are informational tours that bring visitors to the sanctuary. It is estimated about 400 students visit daily. It's also possible to visit after sunset, starting at 18:00, but only by appointment, and in maximum groups of 6 persons.

References

External links
 https://archive.today/20130415181241/http://philippinebatconservation.org/our-partners/monfort-bat-cave-and-conservation-foundation/
 http://news.nationalgeographic.com/news/2011/04/pictures/110405-bats-swarms-caves-philippines-monfort-world-record
 https://www.samalguide.com/activities/monfort-bat-cave/

Caves of the Philippines
Wildlife rehabilitation and conservation centers
Animal conservation organizations
Megabats
Landforms of Davao del Norte
Tourist attractions in Davao del Norte
Animal welfare organizations based in the Philippines